Steven Blyth is a poet (born 1968 in Bolton) based in the Greater Manchester area. His poetry won an Eric Gregory Award in 1994.
He was educated at the University of Bolton and University of Manchester.

Blyth's poetry is of a similar style to poets like Philip Larkin and Stanley Cook.

Publications
Baddy, Peterloo, 1997
So, Peterloo, 2001
Mr Right, Shoestring Press, 2011
Both, Smokestack Press, 2012

References

People from Bolton
1968 births
Living people
English male poets